Intha may refer to:
 Intha people, a Tibeto-Burman ethnic group living in Burma
 Intha, Homalin, a village in Homalin Township, Sagaing Region, Burma
 Intha (gastropod), a genus of gastropods in the family Planorbidae